Paula Sofía Viera (born 25 March 1990) is a Uruguayan futsal player and a footballer who plays as a right back for Peñarol. She has been a member of the Uruguay women's national team.

International career
Viera represented Uruguay at the 2010 South American U-20 Women's Championship. At senior level, she played the 2010 South American Women's Football Championship.

International goals
Scores and results list Uruguay's goal tally first

References 

1990 births
Living people
Women's association football fullbacks
Uruguayan women's footballers
Uruguay women's international footballers
Club Atlético River Plate (Montevideo) players
Peñarol players
Uruguayan women's futsal players